Romy Kasper (born 5 May 1988) is a German racing cyclist, who currently rides for UCI Women's Continental Team . She competed in the 2013 UCI women's road race in Florence. She competed for Germany at the 2016 Summer Olympics in the women's road race where she finished in 44th place.

Major results
2014
1st Stage 2 Thüringen Rundfahrt der Frauen
2016
1st Stage 1 (TTT) Energiewacht Tour (with Ellen van Dijk, Amalie Dideriksen, Nikki Harris and Christine Majerus)
2021
 10th Le Samyn
 10th Dwars door de Westhoek

References

External links
 

1988 births
Living people
German female cyclists
Cyclists from Lower Saxony
People from Diepholz (district)
Cyclists at the 2016 Summer Olympics
Olympic cyclists of Germany
Universiade medalists in cycling
Universiade bronze medalists for Germany
European Games competitors for Germany
Cyclists at the 2019 European Games
Medalists at the 2011 Summer Universiade
20th-century German women
21st-century German women